The laminate vlei rat (Otomys laminatus) is a species of rodent in the family Muridae.
It is found only in South Africa.
Its natural habitats are subtropical or tropical high-altitude grassland and swamps.

References

Endemic fauna of South Africa
Otomys
Mammals of South Africa
Mammals described in 1905
Taxa named by Oldfield Thomas
Taxonomy articles created by Polbot